Hemidactylus depressus, also known as Sri Lanka leaf-nosed gecko or Kandyan gecko, is a species of gecko endemic to island of Sri Lanka.

Description
Head large with large granules, especially on snout. Mid-ventrals 36-40. Digits webbed at base. Lamellae under fourth toe counts 10-11. Tail depressed, with serrated lateral edges. 
Dorsum light brown to gray, with 4-5 dark transverse angular markings. A dark canthal stripe, edged with a pale one. Tail is with dark cross bars. Venter grayish-creamy.

Distribution and habitat
A gecko endemic to Sri Lanka, found only from localities Kantale, Giritale, Mankulam, Alutnuwara, Hunugalla, Elkaduwa, Matale, Rattota, Gammaduwa, Kandy, Knuckles Mountain Range, Haragama, Wakwalla, Palatupana, Balangoda and Vanathavilluwa.

Ecology and diet
Arboreal species from the plains, found on trees, boulders and caves and sometimes enter houses. 
Diet comprises insects.

Reproduction
Lay 2 eggs at a time in rock crevices, tree holes, leaf litter between June–August. Hatchlings emerge during August and September.

References

 http://reptile-database.reptarium.cz/species?genus=Hemidactylus&species=depressus
 http://biodiversityofsrilanka.blogspot.com/2011/01/kandian-gecko-hemidactylus-depressus.html
 http://animaldiversity.ummz.umich.edu/accounts/Hemidactylus_depressus/classification/

Reptiles of Sri Lanka
depressus
Reptiles described in 1842
Taxa named by John Edward Gray